The Southern Lady Jaguars basketball team is the basketball team that represents Southern University in Baton Rouge, Louisiana. The school's team currently competes in the Southwestern Athletic Conference.

Postseason appearances

NCAA Division I Tournament appearances

WNIT appearances

References

External links